John Eland may refer to:

John Eland (chemist)
John Eland (MP) (died 1542)